Terra (the Trade Reference Currency, TRC) is the name of a proposed "world currency". The concept was revived by Belgian economist and expert on monetary systems Bernard Lietaer in 2001, based on a similar proposal from the 1930s.

The currency is meant to be based on a basket of the nine to twelve most important commodities (according to their importance in worldwide trade). Lietaer opines this would provide a currency that wouldn't suffer from inflation:

The basic principle emerged from early concepts presented in an article in the French newspaper Le Fédériste on 1 January 1933. The idea was enthusiastically picked up by Lietaer during an educational journey.

See also

ISO 4217 currency codes
History of money
World currency
Commodity currency
International dollar
Stelo, a 1946 alternate currency intended to be stable by linking to the price of bread in the Netherlands.

References

Bibliography

External links
 The Terra TRC white paper
 L'Europa/die Europa – das Geld des Friedens
 Studienreise Hr. Lietaer im Heimatmuseum Wörgl

Further reading 
 
 

Alternative currencies
Proposed currencies
2001 introductions
2001 in economics
2001 in Belgium